Marble Spring is a stream in Chattooga County, in the U.S. state of Georgia.

Marble Spring was named from the deposits of marble in the area.

References

Springs of Georgia (U.S. state)
Bodies of water of Chattooga County, Georgia